Estonia was represented by 17 athletes (12 men and 5 women) at the 2010 European Athletics Championships held in  Barcelona, Spain, from 27 July to 1 August 2010.

Participants

Results

References 
Participants and results

Nations at the 2010 European Athletics Championships
2010
European Athletics Championshipss